The Luzon short-nosed rat (Tryphomys adustus) is a species of rodent in the family Muridae.  It is the only species in the genus Tryphomys.
It is found only in the Philippines, and is known only from Benguet, Laguna, and Tarlac provinces.

References

Rats of Asia
Rodents of the Philippines
Endemic fauna of the Philippines
Fauna of Luzon
Vulnerable fauna of Asia
Taxonomy articles created by Polbot
Taxa named by Gerrit Smith Miller Jr.